Loyola University Hospital is a 569-licensed-bed facility located on the campus of Loyola University Medical Center in the western suburbs of Chicago, in the U.S. state of Illinois. It houses a Level 1 trauma center, and the Ronald McDonald Children's Hospital of Loyola University Medical Center.

Hospital buildings completed in 1969
Hospitals in Cook County, Illinois
Teaching hospitals in Illinois